= Holiday pass =

In German-speaking countries, a holiday pass (German: Ferienpass) is a document which may be made available by local government or related organisations, entitling schoolchildren to participate in various leisure activities during holiday seasons.

The holiday pass is usually not free of charge, but is designed to be good value, making it an affordable way for parents to occupy their children in an educational and enjoyable way during school holidays. The holiday pass may take the form of a card that is stamped each time the child participates in an activity. The pass may entitle the bearer to use public transport free of charge.
